The Sautauriski mountain (old name: "Mont des Loups") culminates at  in the southern part of Jacques-Cartier National Park, in the municipality of Stoneham-et-Tewkesbury, in the regional county municipality (MRC) of La Jacques-Cartier, in the administrative region of Capitale-Nationale, in Quebec, Canada.

Geography 
The top of the Sautauriski mountain is located at:
  north-east of the Jacques-Cartier river;
  north of the confluence of the Sautauriski and Jacques-Cartier rivers;
  north of the village center of Stoneham-et-Tewkesbury;
  north-west of route 175.

The Sautauriski mountain is wedged between the Jacques-Cartier River which flows on the southwest side and the Sautauriski River which is on the east side. Access to the top of the mountain is easier on the north side. The east and southwest faces have steep cliffs.

Mountain path 
The "Les Loups" trail in the "Sautauriski Mountain" is the most popular with hikers in the Jacques-Cartier National Park. Very well laid out, this marked trail is under forest cover. The rather steep climb for the first portion of the route. This belvedere presents a magnificent panorama on the vertiginous walls bordering the Jacques-Cartier river on the southwest face of the mountain. Then, the path becomes narrower and more rugged along the sides of the mountain.

At the summit, hikers can admire a magnificent panorama of the relief of the Laurentian Mountains, the valleys of the Jacques-Cartier and the Sautauriski. Generally, during the weekends of September until Thanksgiving, the traffic is more important because of the foliage which adopts the colors of autumn. During this busy period, it is required to use a shuttle service from the Park Discovery and Access Center to access the trailhead located at km 16, on the Chemin du Parc-National. The entrance to Parc national de la Jacques-Cartier is located at 103 chemin du Parc-National, in Stoneham-et-Tewkesbury, north of the city of Québec.

Toponymy 
The toponym "Sautauriski mountain" is linked to the toponym of the river of the same name.

The toponym "Montagne de la Sautauriski" was formalized on August 2, 1974 at the Place Names Bank of the Commission de toponymie du Québec.

Notes and references

Related articles 
 La Jacques-Cartier Regional County Municipality
 Stoneham-et-Tewkesbury, a municipality
 Jacques-Cartier National Park
 Laurentides Wildlife Reserve
 Sautauriski River
 Jacques-Cartier River
 Lac Jacques-Cartier Massif

Landforms of Capitale-Nationale
Mountains of Quebec under 1000 metres